Kanigiri is a Town in Prakasam district of the Indian state of Andhra Pradesh. It is a municipality and the headquarters of kanigiri mandal in kanigiri revenue division.

Etymology 
The name is a vernacular transformation of Kanakagiri (Kanaka = gold and Giri = Hill). In olden times it was said that the town adjoining the hill was called Kanakapatnam.

Geography 

Kanigiri Mandal is located on the south side of the Prakasam District having a geographical area of around 490 sq km. Kanigiri Municipality is the 6th largest municipality in Prakasam with an area of 55.36 sq km. Physio-graphically, most of the part of the district is a level plain with an average height of 300 meters showing a gradient towards the East (coast). The remaining Western part is however rugged and higher in elevation (up to 1,200 meters) where the Nallamala and Velikonda hill ranges are the characteristic features of the Landscape. Kanigiri Municipality has a maximum elevation of 380 meters which is on Kanigiri Hill located on the Northern edge of the municipality. Excluding the hill, the Kanigiri Municipality’s average elevation is 95 meters. The minimum elevation is 70 meters and the maximum elevation is 120 meters. The hill base starts at 120 meters and goes up to 380 meters.

Climate 

Kanigiri has a tropical climate, specifically a tropical wet and dry climate (Aw) under the Köppen climate classification, Kanigiri is located near the coast of the Bay of Bengal. The town is surrounded by the range of Eastern Ghats. It has an average elevation of 101  metres (334  feet), and enjoys a hot climate for most of the year.

Regional Connectivity 

Road

Kanigiri is a town in Kanigiri Mandal in Prakasam District of Andhra Pradesh State, India. It is located on the North-West side of the Eastern Ghats. NH 565 passes through the Municipality which connects Kanigiri to Hyderabad on the Northern side and Nellore on the Southern side and further connects to Chennai via NH 16. Other than that, the Ollapalem-Vemulapadu road (Kandukur-Kanigiri Road) which is a State Highway, connects Kanigiri to Kandukur towards the East and further connects it to NH 16. On the Western side, the State Highway connects Kanigiri to Kurnool.

Rail

The nearest Railway Station is at Donakonda which is exactly  50 km far from Kanigiri Municipality. Railway Station at Ongole , Markapur Road railway station and Singarayakonda is around 80 km, 60 km and 65 km away from the Kanigiri Municipality. There is a proposed railway line from Nadikudi to srikalahasti which passes through Kanigiri Town.

Air

Vijayawada is the nearest Airport to Kanigiri is at a distance of 200 km. Other International nearby Airports are Hyderabad, Tirupati and Chennai. All these Airports have good connectivity with major Indian cities like Delhi, Mumbai, Kolkata, Banglore and other International Cities. There is a proposal for a Green Field Domestic Airport at Ongole.

Demographic Profile 
It has a literacy rate of 77.55 per cent. Almost 50% of the Mandal Population lives in Kanigiri Municipality. The population growth rate is gradually declining due to outmigration. Kanigiri is an urban area and the maximum workforce is engaged in non-primary activities. The average household size of 4 and maximum households are engaged in either agriculture or daily wage activities.

Administration 
Kanigiri is also declared as Municipality during 2013-2014 and also a constituency.
Kandhukur is a 2nd-grade municipality with 57315 populations with an extent of 60.32 sq km. The Master Plan for Kandukur was approved vide GO.MS. NO 950 MA, Dated 30/10/2005 with a plan period of 20 years. There are total 20 administrative wards in Kanigiri Municipality. Based on the received Revenue Ward Boundary, the total area of the Kanigiri Municipality is around 47.72 sq km.

Civic services 

Drinking water

Residents depended on monsoon rains for drinking water; currently, water from the reservoir Nagarjuna Sagar Dam via pumplines reaches the town through a plant near Doruvu.

The first cases of endemic skeletal fluorosis (and its neurological signs) in the world were recorded in the Podili, Darsi and Kanigiri areas of Andhra Pradesh in 1937.

Planning

Politics 
Burra Madhu Sudhan Yadav has won the 2019 Andhra Pradesh Assembly elections from YSRCP.
2019 Burra Madhusudan Yadav won from ysrcp as MLA

Transport 
Kanigiri is connected by road to all other cities in Andhra Pradesh by Andhra Pradesh State Road Transport Corporation. National Highway 565 passes through Kanigiri, which connects Hyderabad and Yerpedu.

Landmarks

There is a hill in Kanigiri Municipality in the Northern  side of the town. The hill is under the ownership of the forest department. There is a temple at the top and at the base of the hill and a water body where the Water Treatment Plant and Water Pumping station are located.  There are mines located on the Eastern side of Kanigiri Municipality in Sankavaram Village. Materials like granite are mined out of these mines.

Education
The primary and secondary school education is imparted by government, aided and private schools, under the School Education Department of the state.

See also
Takkallapadu

References 

Towns in Prakasam district